is an island in the Seto Inland Sea, part of the municipality of Kasaoka, Okayama Prefecture, Japan. The island's main commercial activity is fishing.

The island has come to international prominence due to its location as a film set and as the subject of a graphic narrative "Manabe Shima, Island Japan" by illustrator Florent Chavouet first published in France in 2010.

Geography
The island has few roads, but in the face of rural depopulation and downward demographic trends, has managed to retain both its elementary and junior high school. The island features sandy beaches and a mild year round climate. Kasaoka is the closest ferry port.

In 2016, key locations on the island were documented on Google Street View with a backpack mounted camera.

Culture
Manabeshima was the setting for the 1984 film MacArthur's Children, describing the impact of the United States' occupation of Japan from the perspective of the inhabitants of a small island community. The film featured the feature film debut of actor Ken Watanabe starring alongside Masako Natsume and Shima Iwashita.

In 2010, French cartoonist Florent Chavouet, published a travel book entitled « Manabe Shima » dedicated to the island and its inhabitants.

See also
 Shiraishi Island, a larger inhabited island in the Kasaoka Islands group.

References

Islands of Okayama Prefecture
Kansai region
Islands of the Seto Inland Sea